Henning Larsen, Hon. FAIA (20 August 1925 – 22 June 2013) was a Danish architect. He is internationally known for the Ministry of Foreign Affairs building in Riyadh and the Copenhagen Opera House.

Larsen studied at the Royal Danish Academy of Fine Arts, from which he graduated in 1952. He continued studies subsequently at the Architectural Association School of Architecture and the Massachusetts Institute of Technology. His mentors included Arne Jacobsen and Jørn Utzon.

Larsen founded an architectural firm that bears his name, Henning Larsen Architects (formerly Henning Larsens Tegnestue A/S). From 1968 to 1995, he was a professor of architecture at the Royal Danish Academy of Fine Arts. In 1985, he established the SKALA architecture gallery and the parallel SKALA architecture journal, both entities of which continued until 1994.

Buildings

1968 The campus center in Dragvoll at the Norwegian University of Science and Technology, Trondheim
1979 The Danish embassy, Riyadh
1982–87 Commercial college and residences, Frederiksberg
1982–84 Ministry of foreign affairs, Riyadh
1984–85 Gentofte library
1992 The Møller Centre for Continuing Education, Churchill College, Cambridge
1997 Extension of Ny Carlsberg Glyptotek
1995 Egebjerggård, Ballerup
1994–1999 Extension of Malmö City Library
1999 Head office of Nordea, Copenhagen
2004 Copenhagen Opera House
2004 IT University of Copenhagen
2007 Musikens Hus (The house of music), Uppsala, Sweden
2004–2007 The Roland Levinsky Building as part of Plymouth University, England
2008–2011 Der Spiegel headquarters, HafenCity, Hamburg, Germany 
2008-2011 Harpa (Concert hall and conference center), Reykjavík, Iceland

Distinctions
 1965 Eckersberg Medal
 1981 Norwegian Concrete Award for Excellent Building, for the Dragvoll complex in Trondheim
 1985 Honorary member of the American Institute of Architects
 1985 C.F. Hansen Medal
 1986 Prince Eugen Medal
 1987 The Daylight and Building Component Award
 1987 Nykredit Architecture Prize
 1987 International Design Award, United Kingdom
 1989 Aga Khan Award for the Ministry of Foreign Affairs in Riyadh
 1991 Honorary member of the Royal Institute of British Architects
 1997 Kasper Salin Prize, Sweden
 1999 Dreyer Honorary Award
 2001 Stockholm Award
 2012 Praemium Imperiale

Notes

References
Henrik Sten Møller, Legen og lyset. En frise over Henning Larsen som menneske og arkitekt (Light and Life. A portrait of Henning Larsen), Politikens Forlag 2000, 
Henning Larsen, De skal sige tak. Kulturhistorisk testamente om Operaen (You ought to be thankful. A historical document about the Opera), People's Press 2009.

External links

Henning Larsen Architects
Sketches by Henning Larsen
University Campus In Kolding

Modernist architects from Denmark
Danish company founders
Architects from Copenhagen
1925 births
2013 deaths
Royal Danish Academy of Fine Arts alumni
Honorary Fellows of the American Institute of Architects
Recipients of the Eckersberg Medal
Recipients of the Prince Eugen Medal
Fellows of the Royal Institute of British Architects
Recipients of the Praemium Imperiale
Recipients of the C.F. Hansen Medal